South Carolina is the thirty-seventh-richest state in the United States of America, with a per capita income of $18,795 (2000).

South Carolina Counties Ranked by Per Capita Income

Note: Data is from the 2010 United States Census Data and the 2006–2010 American Community Survey 5-Year Estimates.

South Carolina Places Ranked by Per Capita Income

References

United States locations by per capita income
Economy of South Carolina
Income